The Alas Strait is a strait that separates Lombok and Sumbawa, two islands of Indonesia in West Nusa Tenggara province.

The strait was bridged by land until about 14,000 years before present when sea level rose to about 75 meters below present sea level,

unlike Lombok Strait and Alor Strait which continued to be water gaps even during the Last Glacial Maximum, at each end of a 400-mile-long island including present-day Lombok, Sumbawa, Komodo, Flores, Solor, Adonara, and Lembata.

See also
 Lombok Strait, on the opposite side (west) of Lombok
 Makassar Strait
 Sunda Strait
 Wallacea

References

Straits of Indonesia
Straits of the Indian Ocean
Landforms of West Nusa Tenggara
Landforms of Lombok